Giovanni Colonnelli (14 January 1951 – 15 November 2021) was an Italian professional footballer who played for Parma, Reggiana and Maceratese.

References

External links
 

1951 births
2021 deaths
Sportspeople from the Province of Ancona
Italian footballers
Association football midfielders
Parma Calcio 1913 players
A.C. Reggiana 1919 players
S.S. Maceratese 1922 players
Serie B players
Serie C players
Footballers from Marche